Warren Grice Elliott (March 22, 1848 – September 17, 1906) was president of the Atlantic Coast Line Railroad starting in 1902.

Biography
He was born on March 22, 1848 and attended the University of North Carolina at Chapel Hill Class of 1867, where he was a member of the Chi Phi fraternity. He married Margaret Blow on December 5, 1871 and they had as their son, Milton Courtright Elliott in 1879. Warren became president of the Atlantic Coast Line Railroad starting in 1902 when Henry Walters retired. He died on September 17, 1906 in Watkins Glen, New York.

References

Atlantic Coast Line Railroad
1848 births
1906 deaths